GAF is an American manufacturing company based in Parsippany, New Jersey, that has roots dating back to the late 19th century. The GAF acronym stands for General Aniline & Film. The company has historically been primarily focused on manufacturing of roofing materials for residential and commercial applications. At one time GAF was also active in manufacturing photographic film as well as cameras and projectors (both still and motion picture), and was the manufacturer of the View-Master, the famous line of 3D transparencies, viewers and projectors. Briefly in the 1970s, it was the official film of Disneyland and Walt Disney World, and at this time actor Henry Fonda served as the company's spokesman in several television commercials, including one that featured Jodie Foster in her first acting role.
Jim Schnepper is the President of GAF, an operating subsidiary of Standard Industries.

History 

Founded in 1886, GAF has become one of the largest roofing manufacturers in North America, with sales approaching $3 billion. With more than two dozen manufacturing plants located throughout the United States, the company has over 3,000 employees and sells its roofing products worldwide. Originally American IG, began as the American holdings of the German IG Farben.

Timeline 

1886 – Company founded as the Standard Paint Company.
1892 – First ready-to-lay asphalt roofing is created, known as "Ruberoid".
1904 – Method perfected to embed colored granules in asphalt coating.
1912 – Individually-cut asphalt shingles are introduced.
1921 – Based on the success of its roofing line, Standard Paint changes its name to the Ruberoid Company.
1928 - The American holdings of the German company IG Farben were organized into American I.G., later renamed General Aniline & Film or GAF for short.
1933 – Interlocking shingles introduced.
1941 - American assets seized as enemy property by the U.S. government.
1965 - The U.S. government sells shares of GAF.
1966 – General Aniline & Film acquires Sawyer's, manufacturer of photographic equipment.
1967 – Ruberoid merges with General Aniline & Film and adopts the GAF name.
1967 – "Timberline" architectural shingle introduced.
1968 – General Aniline & Film Corp. formally changes its name to GAF Corporation.
1977 - GAF Drops Its Consumer Photographic Lines 
1982 – Samuel J. Heyman takes control of the company.
1989 – Heyman takes the company private; it continues to be owned by the Heyman family.
2004 – Introduces first pre-coated energy-efficient modified bitumen membranes.
2005 – Introduces first energy-efficient asphalt shingle.
2007 – GAF acquires ElkCorp.
2010 – Introduced solar grade single-ply TPO membranes.
2011 – First company to offer lifetime limited warranty on all laminated shingles.
2012 – First company to offer lifetime limited warranty on entire roofing system.

Bankruptcy
On January 7, 2001, GAF's principal shareholder became the 27th company in the United States to file for protection under Chapter 11 of the U.S. Bankruptcy Code from liabilities relating to asbestos-related bodily injury claims. In what was an ill-fated acquisition, GAF's purchase of Ruberoid brought with it a product line that contained considerable quantities of asbestos. The asbestos-containing products ranged from roofing shingles and siding to insulation and numerous other construction-related products. Along with the purchase came ownership of an asbestos mine in Vermont. Once the sale was complete, GAF Corporation became the de facto leader in asbestos supplies in the state. The mine was shut down in 1975. GAF's roofing business (at the time, d/b/a GAF Materials Corporation) was not involved in the manufacture or sale of asbestos containing products, and thus it did not have any liability related to these claims. GAF's shareholder emerged from bankruptcy in 2009, having discharged its asbestos-related bodily injury claims.

References

External links
GAF - Roofing

Companies based in Morris County, New Jersey
Manufacturing companies established in 1886
Building materials companies of the United States
Parsippany-Troy Hills, New Jersey
Companies that filed for Chapter 11 bankruptcy in 2001